Pillkukayna (other spellings Pilco Kayna, Pilcocayna, Pilko Kaina, Pilkokaina, Pillco Kayma) is an archaeological site on the shore of the island of Isla del Sol in the southern part of Lake Titicaca in Bolivia.  It is situated in the La Paz Department, Manco Kapac Province, Copacabana Municipality.

See also 
 Chinkana
 Iñaq Uyu

References 

Archaeological sites in Bolivia
La Paz Department (Bolivia)